Mansuri may refer to:

 Manasir (tribe), tribal name of the United Arab Emirates
Mansuri-ye Jonubi, Bushehr Province
Mansuri-ye Shomali, Bushehr Province
Mansuri-ye Vosta, Bushehr Province
Mansuri, Darab, Fars Province
Mansuri, Pasargad, Fars Province
Mansuri, Khuzestan
Mansuri, alternate name of Mansureh-ye Olya, Khuzestan Province
Mansuri, Razavi Khorasan
Mansuri, Taft, Yazd Province
Mansuri Rural District, in Kermanshah Province

See also 
Mansoori, a Muslim community of north India
Mansouri, a surname
Mansura (disambiguation)